The 2003 New Democratic Party leadership election was held to replace New Democratic Party of Canada leader Alexa McDonough, after her retirement. It ended on January 25, 2003, with the first ballot victory of popular Toronto city councillor Jack Layton.

The election was the first to be conducted under the NDP's new partial one member, one vote system, in which the popular vote of the members is weighted for 75% of the result. The rest are votes cast by delegates for affiliated organizations (mainly labour unions). It was also the first Canadian leadership convention to allow Internet voting; delegates who chose to vote electronically were given a password to a secure website to register their votes.

The race was heated, with the leaders campaigning to NDP audiences across Canada. One of the most notable events of the campaign occurred at the convention in Toronto, the day before the election, when candidate Pierre Ducasse made a stirring speech. Ducasse's speech attracted widespread praise, although its late delivery was unable to sway the postal and internet votes which had already been cast.

Candidates

Jack Layton

At the time of the election, Jack Layton was the Toronto City Councillor for Ward 30 and vice chair of Toronto Hydro, and a former university lecturer and environmental consultant. He had run and lost in both the 1993 and 1997 federal elections. His emphases included homelessness, affordable housing, opposing violence, the natural environment and the green economy. While other campaigns stressed federal experience, Layton's campaign contended that his record on Toronto council and as former president of the Federation of Canadian Municipalities encompassed national issues and would transfer to the federal stage, and that as Alexa McDonough had on her election as leader, he could lead the party successfully from outside Parliament until winning his own seat.
Endorsements: Ed Broadbent, Svend Robinson, Libby Davies, former Ontario NDP leader Stephen Lewis 
Date campaign launched: July 22, 2002

Bill Blaikie

At the time of the election, Bill Blaikie was the MP for Winnipeg-Transcona, the NDP House leader and the critic on intergovernmental affairs, justice, the Solicitor General, and parliamentary reform. He had been a Member of Parliament for over 20 years. His emphases included trade, Medicare, taxes and the environment, and his parliamentary experience. An ordained minister in the United Church of Canada, Blaikie was a prominent heir to the Social Gospel, Christian left tradition deeply rooted in the NDP.
Endorsements: MPs Wendy Lill, Judy Wasylycia-Leis, Pat Martin, Bev Desjarlais, Dick Proctor and Yvon Godin, Manitoba Premier Gary Doer, Ontario New Democratic Party leader Howard Hampton and several former MPs
Date campaign launched: June 17, 2002

Lorne Nystrom

Lorne Nystrom was the MP for Regina—Qu'Appelle at the time of the election, and the NDP critic of economic policy, finance, banks, national revenue, public accounts, Crown corporations and electoral reform. Through his 29 years in Parliament, it was the third time he had run for leader. Nystrom campaigned heavily on the issue of electoral reform. Other emphases included his parliamentary experience and practical left-wing economics; he had edited a book on financial issues, Just Making Change.
Date campaign launched: July 31, 2002

Joe Comartin

Joe Comartin was the MP for Windsor—St. Clair and the party's environment critic at the time of the election. His election in 2000 had been the first federal win for the NDP in Ontario in ten years, and he had helped add a second Ontario seat with Brian Masse's win in the neighbouring riding of Windsor West in 2002. He emphasised foreign affairs, particularly in the Middle East, and his campaign included significant outreach to Arab and Muslim Canadians. Comartin received high profile support from the Canadian Auto Workers. Of the candidates, Comartin was considered the furthest left on economic policy.

Endorsements: MP Brian Masse, CAW President Buzz Hargrove, CAW Local 444 President Ken Lewenza Sr., former aide to Howard Hampton and publisher Ish Theilheimer
Date campaign launched: August 13, 2002

Pierre Ducasse

Pierre Ducasse was the Associate President of the NDP at the time of the election. His underdog campaign stressed outreach in Quebec and building the party toward electoral success. It also drew on Ducasse's background in co-operative economics.
Endorsements: Ken Georgetti, president of the Canadian Labour Congress

Bev Meslo
Bev Meslo was a Vancouver-area activist and represented the New Democratic Party Socialist Caucus in the leadership election.

Results

NOTES:

The labour votes at convention were weighted to equal 1/3 of the total membership votes cast (43,652 / 3 = 14,550.67).

This was done to ensure that labour held 25% of the total votes cast for Leader, as required by the NDP Constitution.

As a result, the vote of each labour delegate was equal to approximately 15.2 membership votes.

Campaign contributions were those reported on the interim financial statements, as of November 30, 2002.

Timeline

2002
June 5: Alexa McDonough announces she will step down as leader.
June 17: Bill Blaikie declares his candidacy.
July 5–7: The NDP Federal Council convenes to adopt rules.
June 25: Pierre Ducasse declares his candidacy.
July 22: Jack Layton declares his candidacy.
July 30: Bev Meslo declares her candidacy.
July 31: Lorne Nystrom declares his candidacy.
August 13: Joe Comartin declares his candidacy.
November 26: Final day for candidates to declare candidacy.
December 12: Last day to become an NDP member who can vote.

2003
January 24: The convention begins in Toronto, Ontario.
January 25: Ballots are cast, Layton declared victorious.

Notes

New Democratic Party
2003
New Democratic Party leadership election